The Comp Air 4 (also known as the Comp Monster) is an American light civil utility aircraft manufactured in kit form by Comp Air. Builders are able to choose between an airframe designed for engines in the 140-180 hp (104-134 kW) range, and a heavier one for 250 hp (187 kW) units. The latter airframe can be fitted with up to six seats, while the standard airframe seats four. The Comp Air 4 may be built with tailwheel, tricycle, float, or amphibious float undercarriage.

The company website does not list it as being in production in 2022.

Specifications (typical Comp Air 4 on wheels)

See also

References
Notes

Bibliography
 Jackson, Paul. Jane's All The World's Aircraft 2003–2004. Coulsdon, UK: Jane's Information Group, 2003. .

External links
Official website archives on Archive.org

4
Homebuilt aircraft
1990s United States civil utility aircraft
High-wing aircraft
Single-engined tractor aircraft
Aircraft first flown in 1995